Lablab purpureus is a species of bean in the family Fabaceae. It is native to Africa and it is cultivated throughout the tropics for food. English language common names include hyacinth bean, lablab-bean bonavist bean/pea, dolichos bean, seim or sem bean, lablab bean, Egyptian kidney bean, Indian bean, bataw and Australian pea. It is the only species in the monotypic genus Lablab.

Description
The plant is variable due to extensive breeding in cultivation, but in general, they are annual or short-lived perennial vines. The wild species is perennial. The thick stems can reach  in length. They may be hairy on the undersides. The inflorescence is made up of racemes of many flowers. Some cultivars have white flowers, and others may have purplish or blue. The fruit is a legume pod variable in shape, size, and color. It is usually several centimeters long and bright purple to pale green. It contains up to four seeds. The seeds are white, brown, red, or black depending on the cultivar, sometimes with a white hilum. Wild plants have mottled seeds. The seed is about a centimeter long.

Subspecific classification 
According to the British biologist and taxonomist Bernard Verdcourt,
there are two cultivated subspecies of Lablab purpureus (L.) Sweet: 
 Lablab purpureus subsp. bengalensis (Jacq.) Verdc. (Syn.: Dolichos bengalensis Jacq., Dolichos lablab subsp. bengalensis (Jacq.) Rivals, Lablab niger subsp. bengalensis (Jacq.) Cuf.)
 Lablab purpureus subsp. purpureus
in addition to one wild subspecies: 
 Lablab purpureus subsp. uncinatus
of which a special variant with lobed leaflets exists only in Namibia: 
 Lablab purpureus var. rhomboïdeus (Schinz).

Uses
The hyacinth bean is an old domesticated pulse and multi-purpose crop. L. purpureus has been cultivated in India as early as 2500 BC.

Due to seed availability of one forage cultivar (cv. Rongai), it is often grown as forage for livestock and as an ornamental plant. In addition, it is cited both as a medicinal plant and a poisonous plant.

The fruit and beans are edible if boiled well with several changes of the water. Otherwise, they are toxic due to the presence of cyanogenic glycosides, glycosides that are converted to hydrogen cyanide when consumed. Signs of poisoning include weakness, vomiting, shortness of breath, twitching, stupor, and convulsions. It has been shown that there is a wide range of cyanogenic potential among the varieties.

The leaves are eaten raw or cooked like spinach. The flowers can be eaten raw or steamed. The root can be boiled or baked for food. The seeds are used to make tofu and tempeh.

Food in South Asia
In India lablab is called  (in Gujarati). In Bangladesh and West Bengal, the green pods along with the beans, known as sheem (শিম), are cooked as vegetables or cooked with fish as a curry.

The beans as well as the bean pods are used in cooking curries.

In Tamil Nadu, it is called avarai or avaraikkaay (Tamil: அவரைக்காய் / அவரை). The entire bean is used in cooking dry curries and in sauces/gravies such as sambar. The seed alone is used in many recipes and is referred to as mochai (Tamil: மொச்சை / மொச்சைக்கொட்டை).

In Maharashtra, dry preparations with green masala are often made out of these green beans (ghevda varieties; Shravan ghevda (French beans), bajirao ghevda, ghevda, walwar, pavta sheng) mostly at the end of monsoon season during fasting festivals of Shravan month.

In Karnataka, the hyacinth bean is made into curry (avarekalu saaru)(), salad (avarekaalu usli), added to upma (avrekaalu uppittu), and as a flavoring to Akki rotti. Sometimes the outer peel of the seed is removed and the inner soft part is used for a variety of dishes. This form is called hitakubele avarekalu, which means "pressed (hitaku) hyacinth bean," and a curry known as hitikida avarekaalu saaru is made out of the deskinned beans.

In Telangana and Andra Pradesh, the bean pods are cut into small pieces and cooked as a spicy curry in the Pongal festival season. Sometimes the outer peel of the seed when tender and soaked overnight is removed and the inner soft part is used for a variety of dishes. This form is called pitakapappu hanupa/anapa, which means "pressed (pitaku) hyacinth bean, and a curry known as pitikina anapaginjala chaaru/pitaka pappu is made from the deskinned beans and eaten along with bajra bread.

Food in Southeast and East Asia
In Huế, Vietnam, hyacinth beans are the main ingredient of the dish chè đậu ván (Hyacinth Bean Sweet Soup).

In China, the seeds are known as Bai Bian Dou. They are usually dried and baked before being used in traditional Chinese herbal remedies to strengthen the spleen, reduce heat and dampness, and promote appetite.

Food tradition in East Africa
In Kenya, the bean, known as njahe or njahi, is popular among several communities, especially the Kikuyu. Seasons were actually based on it, i.e., the Season of Njahe (Kīmera kīa njahī). It is thought to encourage lactation and has historically been the main dish for breastfeeding mothers. Beans are boiled and mashed with ripe and/or semi-ripe bananas, giving the dish a sweet taste.  Today the production is in decline in eastern Africa. This is partly attributed to the fact that under colonial rule in Kenya, farmers were forced to give up their local bean in order to produce common beans (Phaseolus vulgaris) for export.

Medicinal use
Taiwanese research found that a carbohydrate-binding protein (i.e. a legume lectin) from lablab beans effectively blocks the infections of influenza viruses and SARS-CoV-2.

Gallery

Further reading

References

External links 

Dolichos bean, Lablab purpureus (L.) Sweet by the University of Agricultural Sciences, Bangalore, India

 JSTOR Global Plants: Lablab purpureus

Phaseoleae
Monotypic Fabaceae genera
Edible legumes
Flora of the Maldives
Forages
Nitrogen-fixing crops
Tropical agriculture
Taxa named by Carl Linnaeus

sa:निष्पावः